is a railway station in the city of Hanamaki, Iwate, Japan, operated by East Japan Railway Company (JR East).

Lines
Oyamada Station is served by the 90.2 km Kamaishi Line, and is located 8.3 km from the starting point of the line at Hanamaki Station.

Station layout
The station has a single side platform serving a single bi-directional track. The station is unattended.

History
It became a full passenger station and was renamed Oyamada Station 23 November 1915. The Iwate Light Railway was nationalized on 1 August 1936, becoming the Kamaishi Line. The station was absorbed into the JR East network upon the privatization of the Japanese National Railways (JNR) on 1 April 1987.

The station building is scheduled to be rebuilt and replaced with a new single-storey wooden structure between December 2017 and February 2018.

Surrounding area
The station is located in a rural area.

See also
 List of railway stations in Japan

References

External links

  

Railway stations in Iwate Prefecture
Kamaishi Line
Railway stations in Japan opened in 1913
Hanamaki, Iwate
Stations of East Japan Railway Company